Andrognathus is a genus of North American millipedes in the family Andrognathidae, containing three species: A. corticarius, A. grubbsi, and A. hoffmani. The fossil species Andrognathus burmiticus is known from approximately 99 million year old Burmese amber from Myanmar, showing that the genus had a much wider distribution in the past.

References

External links

 

Articles created by Qbugbot
Millipedes of North America
Millipede genera
Platydesmida